Yuliet Rodríguez Jiménez (born August 24, 1977) is a former Cuban racing cyclist.  She established herself as one of the most consistent Latin American cyclists in a country that has produced great female racers since the sport was first introduced to Cuban women in the mid-1980s.

Cycling experience
A member of the Cuban national team since 1995, Rodríguez claimed over a dozen national titles in the time trial, the 3.000m pursuit, the points race and the road race, as well as six victories in the Copa 8 de Marzo, Cuba's annual stage race for women. Rodríguez's most recent national championship victory was in the 2005 women's road race.

Rodríguez finished 9th in the women's Giro d'Italia, and in the same year took 10th overall in the Vuelta a España. She also represented Cuba at the 1999 Pan American Games in Winnipeg, Canada, and the 1995 Junior World Championships in Italy. She was 2nd overall in the Tour of Mexico and Pan American Champion in the road race.

Rodríguez won the Tour de Guadeloupe in 1997 and 1998 and was third at the time trial in the Central American and Caribbean Games in Maracaibo, Venezuela.

In 2001, Rodríguez won three medals (two silver and one bronze) at the UCI Pan American Cycling Championships in Medellín, Colombia. She has also raced in different World Cup races on the track in Mexico and Colombia. Her personal best in the 3.000m pursuit is 3:43, set in Cali, Colombia. Rodríguez is an excellent climber, time trialist and stage racer.

Race results

2004-2006
1st Copa 8 de Marzo (2005, 2006)
1st Cuban National Championships – Road Race
1st Cuban National Championships – Points Race
1st Cuban National Championships – Scratch Race
1st ALBA Games – Road Race
1st ALBA Games – Time Trial
2nd Vuelta a Habana del Este
2nd ALBA Games – Scratch Race
3rd ALBA Games – Points Race
3rd  Cuban National Championships – Individual Pursuit
7th UCI Pan-Am Continental Championships – Time Trial

2003
1st Cuban National Championships – Time Trial
2nd Cuban National Championships – Road Race
2nd Vuelta a Habana del Este
3rd  Cuban National Championships – Points Race

2002
2nd Copa 8 de Marzo
2nd Cuban National Championships – Time Trial
2nd Vuelta a Habana del Este
3rd  Cuban National Championships – Road Race

2001
1st Cuban National Championships – Road Race
1st Cuban National Championships – Time Trial
1st Copa 8 de Marzo
2nd UCI Pan-Am Continental Championships – Individual Pursuit
2nd UCI Pan-Am Continental Championships – Points Race
3rd  UCI Pan-Am Continental Championships – Time Trial

2000
1st Cuban National Championships – Time Trial
1st Vuelta a Habana del Este
2nd Cuban National Championships – Road Race
2nd Copa 8 de Marzo

1999
1st Cuban National Championships – Road Race
1st Cuban National Championships – Time Trial
1st Copa 8 de Marzo
1st Vuelta a Habana del Este
4th Pan American Games – Road Race
6th Vuelta a España – Points Classification
9th Giro d'Italia – General Classification
10th Vuelta a España – General Classification

1998
1st Cuban National Championships – Road Race
1st Cuban National Championships – Time Trial
1st Copa 8 de Marzo
2nd Cuban National Championships – Points Race
3rd Cuban National Championships – Individual Pursuit
3rd CAC Games – Time Trial
4th CAC Games – Road Race

1997
1st UCI Pan-Am Continental Championships – Road Race
1st Cuban National Championships – Road Race
1st Cuban National Championships – Time Trial
1st Copa 8 de Marzo
1st Tour of Guadeloupe
3rd  UCI Pan-Am Continental Championships – Time Trial

1996
1st Cuban National Championships – Road Race
1st Cuban National Championships – Time Trial
1st Cuban National Championships – Points Race
1st Tour of Guadeloupe
3rd Cuban National Championships – Individual Pursuit
3rd  UCI Pan-Am Continental Championships – Time Trial
3rd  UCI Pan-Am Continental Championships – Road Race

1995
1st Cuban National Championships – Time Trial
2nd Tour of Mexico
2nd Cuban National Championships – Road Race
5th Junior World Championships – Road Race
5th Junior World Championships – Individual Pursuit

Other
Rodríguez Jiménez is the wife of former US professional cyclist Joseph M. Papp; the two were married in Havana, Cuba on October 8, 2004. In 2006, Rodríguez defected from Cuba while in Russia in an attempt to reunite with her husband who was in Italy. After a global flight that included weeks spent in hiding and the use of an assumed identity, Rodríguez was kidnapped in Caracas, Venezuela by Cuban security agents operating with approval from the Chavez regime, held incommunicado for 20 days and finally forcibly repatriated to Cuba.

References

External links

 Profile on RoCAB
 Cuban media coverage
 
 Cycling News article

1977 births
Living people
Cuban female cyclists
Cyclists at the 1999 Pan American Games
Place of birth missing (living people)
Pan American Games competitors for Cuba
20th-century Cuban women
21st-century Cuban women